The RPL-20 (Russian: Ручной Пулемёт Ленточный, Ruchnoy Pulemot Lentochnyy; English: Belt-fed Machine Gun) is a prototype light machine gun developed by Kalashnikov Concern for the Russian Military. Though designed in response to feedback following the purchase and testing of the company's magazine-fed RPK-16 light machine gun, the RPL-20 is an entirely new design, utilizing an open-bolt, belt-fed action in lieu of the closed-bolt, magazine fed operation typical to Kalashnikov-pattern weapons. It is anticipated to serve as a squad automatic weapon in Russian military use, supplementing the heavier-caliber PK machine guns currently used for suppressive fire while still providing a higher practical rate of fire than is possible with RPK-based weapons. The RPL-20 was unveiled at the Army-2020 event in late August, 2020.

Design details 

Kalashnikov Concern has stated that the RPL-20 is a new design, rather than being a derivative of the ubiquitous Kalashnikov-pattern rifle series. It is a belt-fed, open bolt, fully automatic light machine gun with a rotating bolt and a long-stroke gas piston.

The use of a non-disintegrating linked belt like the obsolete RPD seems like a step backwards. However, it does make sense. Other designs tried to be dual feed (i.e., capable of both magazine- and belt-feed) to be an improvement over the RPK-74. Making it belt-feed-only keeps it lighter and less complex than a dual-feed model and allows the troops in the field to top off spent belts. However it loses the RPK's ability to use ammo commonality from assault rifle magazines. It would also add additional troops to the weapons team to act as ammo bearers to carry full belts and fetch and reload empty ones.       

Aside from this, little is known about the RPL-20. The weapon is still in development, which Kalashnikov Concern predicts will take another 2–3 years. Despite the weapon's developmental nature, Kalashnikov Concern has provided video of the weapon being handled and fired, demonstrating that they have at least completed a fully-functioning prototype.

History 

Russian (at the time Soviet) military forces have not fielded a squad-level, intermediate caliber, belt-fed machine gun since the retirement of the RPD in the early 1960s. Official Soviet doctrine from the 1960s onward dictated that squad-level suppressive fire would be provided by the RPK, while PK machine guns would be issued at the company level to provide heavier fire. While the RPK was a simpler, lighter, easier to use weapon than the RPD it replaced, it did not always perform as well as had been hoped. The weapon's magazine feed system, light weight, and fixed barrel made it excellent for one-man operation, but also hampered its ability to provide continuous suppressive fire. As such, some squad machine gunners were equipped with PK machine guns as needed.

As the Soviet military moved from the 7.62×39 mm round to the 5.45×39 mm cartridge for its rifles and light machine guns, it considered adopting a dual-feed light machine gun in the new caliber to replace the RPK, similar to the FN Minimi then being introduced in Western armies. This resulted in the development of the PU-21 light machine gun. The weapon was trialed, but rejected as being more complex and heavier than the new RPK-74, while still not providing squads with the boost in firepower a PK machine gun could provide. Meanwhile, a modernized development of the PK, the PKM, had been introduced. The PKM was lighter than its predecessor, at 7.5 kg, making it even easier to issue the weapon to squad machine gunners as necessary. In the US, there was a significant gap between the weight and firepower of the 2.89 kg M16 and either the 10.5 kg M60 or 12.5 kg M240. This sizable gap is what drove adoption of the intermediate caliber, 7.1 kg M249. With a 7.5 kg PKM general-purpose machine gun that weighed little more than the 4.8 kg RPK, the Soviets had little desire for the PU-21 or similar weapons.

Since the rejection of the PU-21, the Russian military has not indicated any desire for a belt-fed, intermediate caliber machine gun. The MVD solicited designs for a similar weapon beginning in 2011, for use by counter-terror teams, though it did not follow through with any actual orders. There have, however, been competitions to replace the RPK-74, leading to the selection of the RPK-16 for field trials. Based on feedback from these field trials, Kalashnikov Concern independently began development of the RPL-20. With an empty weight of 5.2-5.5 kg, the RPL-20 rivals the weight of an RPK-74 while providing belt-fed, open-bolt operation and quick-change barrels to enhance sustained fire.

See also
PK machine gun
PKP Pecheneg machine gun
M249 light machine gun
IP-2
IWI Negev
QJY-88
QJS-161
QJY-201
FN EVOLYS

References 

Light machine guns
Machine guns of Russia
5.45×39mm machine guns
Post–Cold War weapons of Russia